The 2021–22 season was the 134th competitive association football season in India.

National teams

India national football team

2022 FIFA World Cup qualification

Friendlies (2021)

SAFF Championship

Friendlies (2022)

India women's national football team

Friendlies (2021)

Tournament of Manaus

Unofficial friendlies

2022 AFC Women's Asian Cup

Friendlies (2022)

India women's national under-20 football team

2021 SAFF U-19 Women's Championship

India national futsal team

AFC Futsal Asian Cup

Did not enter

AFC club competitions

2021 AFC Cup

Playoff round 

|+South Asia Zone

Group D

Inter-zone play-off semi-finals

2021 AFC Women's Club Championship

2022 AFC Champions League

2022 AFC Cup

Preliminary round 2

|+South Asia Zone

Play-off round

|+South Asia Zone

Group D

2022 AFC Futsal Club Championship

Club competitions

Indian Super League

Regular season

Playoffs

I-League

State football leagues

Reliance Foundation Development League

Indian Women's League
 Qualification 
The following four teams from four states played each other once during April in the qualifying round at the Ambedkar Stadium in New Delhi.

 Main round

AIFF Futsal Club Championship

Knock-out stage
Bracket

References

 
Football
Football
India
India
Seasons in Indian football